SS William C. Moreland was a  long Great Lakes freighter that ran aground on Sawtooth Reef, Lake Superior on 18 October 1910, only a month after entering service. Visibility was poor due to the smoke from several forest fires, causing the William C. Moreland to ran full steam onto a reef.

Sir Trevor Dawson was christened on 18 October 1916, exactly six years after William C. Moreland wrecked. Sir Trevor Dawson continued to sail for fifty-four years until she was scrapped in 1970, in Spain as the steamer Parkdale.

History
The large fleet was managed by W.H. Becker, a prominent fleet manager and owner from Cleveland, Ohio.

It was reported that William C. Moreland was the last launching of the year at AMSHIP's Lorain, Ohio yard. Miss Esther Moreland of Pittsburgh christened the new vessel. She was the niece of the vessel's namesake, a  prominent Pittsburgh attorney who was a vice-president and secretary of Jones and Laughlin Steel Company.

On August 23, 1910 William C. Moreland was temporarily enrolled at Cleveland, Ohio and assigned a U.S. official identification number U.S. #207851 for delivery to Jones and Laughlin's Interstate Steamship Company fleet. William C. Moreland cost nearly $450,000, she was 600 feet in overall length ( between perpendiculars) with a beam of  feet and a depth of  feet and measured at 7,514 gross register tons and 5,803 net register tons. The she was powered by a  triple-expansion steam engine and fueled by two coal-fired Scotch marine boilers. She had an arch frame construction and three cargo holds with 36 cargo hatches placed on  centers. William C. Moreland was Jones and Laughlin's largest ship at the time of her construction. William C. Moreland usually carried coal when she was upbound and iron ore when she was downbound.

Final voyage
On her fifth trip William C. Moreland left Superior, Wisconsin during the early hours October 18, 1910 with 10,700 tons of iron ore bound for Ashtabula, Ohio. The weather on Lake Superior was relatively mild with little or no wind or wave action, but visibility was hampered by smoke coming from several forest fires burning on the Keweenaw Peninsula in Michigan's Upper Peninsula. Vast stretches of brush and forests were burning on the peninsula due to drought-like conditions in the area causing severe visibility problems. Approaching the Keweenaw Peninsula about 17 hours after she left port the first mate, unsure of William C. Morelands position sighted an unidentified beam of white light. He called Captain Claude Ennes to the bridge at about 9:00 at night. A few minutes later William C. Moreland ran aground Sawtooth Reef.

Salvage efforts

The hull of William C. Moreland remained intact until October 20, 1910 when the ship broke in two between the tenth and eleventh hatch due to the pressure the hull was under. Further cracking occurred near hatch 23 due to the enormous strain put on the hull by the flooded and loaded cargo holds and the unsupported midsection. The salvage rights were eventually sold to the Reid Wrecking Company of Sarnia, Ontario. The Reid Wrecking Company managed to salvage the -long stern of the ship, the -long bow stayed on the reef until it slid off and sank. The stern was reused as part of Sir Trevor Dawson.

On March 25, 1911, American Shipbuilding Company launched the -long freighter  which was ordered by the Jones and Laughlin Steel Company to replace William C. Moreland. Thomas Walters sailed until 1984 when she was scrapped in Ashtabula, Ohio.

William C. Moreland wreck
The wreck has been largely flattened by years of ice and wave action, but there is still a lot of machinery, and numerous pieces of her hull left on the wreck site. William C. Morelands wreck is part of the Keweenaw Underwater Preserve.

References

External links

 Diving the wreck of the Moreland

 

Great Lakes freighters
1910 ships
Shipwrecks of Lake Superior
Ships built in Lorain, Ohio
Merchant ships of the United States
Steamships of the United States
Maritime incidents in 1910
Ships powered by a triple expansion steam engine
Protected areas of Keweenaw County, Michigan
Protected areas of Houghton County, Michigan
Shipwrecks of the Michigan coast
Wreck diving sites in the United States